Washington Township is the name of given to 3 active and 5 defunct townships in the U.S. state of South Dakota:

Active townships
 Washington Township, Aurora County, South Dakota
 Washington Township, Clark County, South Dakota
 Washington Township, Douglas County, South Dakota

Defunct townships
 Washington Township, Bon Homme County, South Dakota
 Washington Township, Charles Mix County, South Dakota
 Washington Township, Hyde County, South Dakota
 Washington Township, Jones County, South Dakota
 Washington Township, McPherson County, South Dakota
		
See also

Washington Township (disambiguation)

South Dakota township disambiguation pages